67th meridian may refer to:

67th meridian east, a line of longitude east of the Greenwich Meridian
67th meridian west, a line of longitude west of the Greenwich Meridian